National Highway 727H, commonly referred to as NH 727H is an underconstruction national highway in India that starts from Barabanki and end to Lakhimpur. It is a secondary route of National Highway 27.  NH-727H runs in the state of Uttar Pradesh in India.

Route 
NH727H connects Barabanki, Dewa sharif, Fatehpur, Mahmudabad, Biswan, Laharpur and Lakhimpur in the state of Uttar Pradesh.

Junctions  
 
  Terminal near Barabanki.
  Terminal near Lakhimpur.

See also 
 List of National Highways in India
 List of National Highways in India by state

References

External links 

 NH 727H on OpenStreetMap

National highways in India
National Highways in Uttar Pradesh